Prorella insipidata is an American moth of the family Geometridae first described by Pearsall in 1910. It lives in Oregon, California, Arizona, New Mexico and Texas.

The wingspan is about 16 mm. Adults have been recorded on wing from July to October.

References

Moths described in 1910
Eupitheciini